Jülich-Cleves-Berg can refer to one of two historical territories:

 United Duchies of Jülich-Cleves-Berg (1521–1614), a state of the Holy Roman Empire
 Province of Jülich-Cleves-Berg (1815–22), a province of the Kingdom of Prussia